Andreas Tölzer (also spelled Toelzer; born 27 January 1980) is a German judoka.

Achievements

References

 Andreas Toelzer at JudoInside.com

External links
 

1980 births
Living people
German male judoka
Judoka at the 2004 Summer Olympics
Judoka at the 2008 Summer Olympics
Judoka at the 2012 Summer Olympics
Olympic judoka of Germany
Olympic medalists in judo
Olympic bronze medalists for Germany
Medalists at the 2012 Summer Olympics
Sportspeople from Bonn
21st-century German people
20th-century German people